The flag of Junqueirópolis (bandeira de Junqueirópolis) is the official flag of the municipality of Junqueirópolis in the western region of the state of São Paulo, Brazil.  It was legally instituted on 30 May 1978.

The flag is sky blue with a white equilateral triangle in the center surrounding the municipal coat of arms.  The blue represents the waterways of the region and the sky overhead.  The white represents the desire to live and prosper peacefully.

The equilateral triangle represents the following triads:
 God, Country and Family
 Freedom, Equality and Fraternity
 Judiciary, Legislative and Executive government
 White people (a branca), Yellow people (amarela) and Black people (negra).  In this case, amarela probably refers to índios but may also include the local Japanese Brazilian population and other people of Asian descent.

References

Junqueiropolis
Flags introduced in 1978
1978 establishments in Brazil
São Paulo (state)